Nabeesa Ummal is an academic, orator, social worker and Communist Party of India (Marxist) politician from Kerala, India. She is the first Muslim girl to pursue a postgraduate degree in Malayalam. She was elected to Kerala Legislative Assembly from Kazhakoottam Assembly constituency in 1987 as an independent candidate with the support of Left Democratic Front.

Biography
Nabeesa Ummal was born on June 30, 1931, in Kallanvila, Attingal, in present-day Thiruvananthapuram district of Kerala, as the youngest of five children of Asanummal, a native of Bhoothapandi, Tamil Nadu, and Khader Moideen, a police constable. After studying at Attingal Government Girls High school, Nabeesa Ummal studied Intermediate, Bachelor's degree in Economics and post graduation in Malayalam from Thiruvananthapuram Women's College. She is the first Muslim girl to pursue a postgraduate degree in Malayalam.

Nabeesa married Hussain Kunju, a soldier from Nedumangad, while pursuing her pre-university studies at the Thiruvananthapuram Women's College. The couple have six children.

Career
After studies, in 1955, Nabeesa joined as third grade junior lecturer at her alma mater. She then worked as a lecturer in seven colleges in five districts in Kerala and was later promoted to Principal at Government College Malappuram. Nabeesa then returned to the Women's College, where she became first a professor, then the head of department of Malayalam and then a principal. Nabeesa was the first woman principal from the Malayalam section at the college. She retired as principal in 1986.

Nabeesa has been an orator since she was in school. E. M. S. Namboodiripad invited her to contest the Kerala Legislative Assembly after listening to her speeches during the Sharia controversy that time. She contested and was elected to Kerala Legislative Assembly from Kazhakoottam Assembly constituency in 1987 as an independent candidate with support of Left Democratic Front. But in the 1991 elections, she contested as Left Democratic Front candidate, but lost to M. V. Raghavan of the Communist Marxist Party. In 1995, she was elected to the Nedumangad Municipal Corporation and became the chairperson.

Nabeesa also served as the member of the State Planning Advisory Committee, IMG Governing Body, Examination Board of Kerala and MG universities, Public Library Committee, Public Undertaking Committee and Kerala PSC Question Making Committee.

Awards and honors
In 2000, she was awarded the Central Government Award for Women's Empowerment.

References

1930 births
Living people
Communist Party of India (Marxist) politicians from Kerala
People from Thiruvananthapuram district
Kerala MLAs 1987–1991